The Canadian River is a tributary of the North Platte River, approximately  long, located in Jackson County in north central Colorado in the United States. It drains the eastern edge of the North Park basin along the western side of Medicine Bow Mountains.

It rises in several short forks that descend from the southwest edge of the Medicine Bow Mountains near Clark Peak in southeastern Jackson County, north of Gould and northwest of Cameron Pass. It descends to the northwest through the Colorado State Forest, and in the valley floor, where it becomes a braided stream as it passes through ranch country. It roughly skirts the eastern edge of the valley, roughly parallel to the Michigan River to the west. It joins the North Platte from the east in north central Jackson County, approximately 7 mi (12 km) north of Walden and approximately 2 mi (3 km) downstream from the mouth of the Michigan.

See also
List of rivers of Colorado

References

Rivers of Jackson County, Colorado
Rivers of Colorado
Tributaries of the Platte River